PP-270 Kot Addu-II is a Constituency of Provincial Assembly of Punjab.

General elections 2013

General elections 2008

See also
 PP-269 Kot Addu-I
 PP-271 Kot Addu-III

References

Provincial constituencies of Punjab, Pakistan
PP-252

Constituencies of Muzaffargarh
Politics of Muzaffargarh
Constituencies of Pakistan